The 1930 San Diego State Aztecs football team represented San Diego State Teachers College during the 1930 NCAA football season.

San Diego State competed in the Southern California Intercollegiate Athletic Conference (SCIAC). The 1930 San Diego State team was led by head coach Walter Herreid in his first season with the Aztecs. They played home games at Navy "Sports" Field. The Aztecs finished the season with five wins and four losses (5–4, 3-3 SCIAC). Overall, the team outscored its opponents 112–71 points for the season. This included shutting out their opponents three times and being shut out two times.

Schedule

Notes

References

San Diego State
San Diego State Aztecs football seasons
San Diego State Aztecs football